Marcus Leric "Lobo" Jr. Joseph (born 29 April 1991) is a Trinidadian professional footballer who plays as a forward for I-League club Mohammedan and the Trinidad and Tobago national team.

Career

Gokulam Kerala
In January 2019, Marcus signed for I-League side Gokulam Kerala FC. He scored his debut goal for the club in his debut match against Churchill Brothers in the 14th minute of the game which they ended up losing 3–1. As latest foreign signing of the season, he scored 7 goals in 9 matches during the 2018–19 I-League. Marcus played a crucial role in Gokulam's success in the Durand Cup 2019 as they emerged as the champions of the tournament by defeating Mohun Bagan 2–1. Marcus was named Man of the Match in the final as he scored both the goals for Gokulam. He was named as the Man of the Tournament and given the Golden Boot for his 11 goals in the campaign.

Mohammedan Sporting
On 7 July 2021, Joseph signed with Kolkata-based Mohammedan Sporting on a one-year deal. He was part of the team's 2021 Durand Cup campaign, in which he scored 5 goals as they reached to the final, defeating FC Bengaluru United 4–2. On 3 October 2021, they lost the title winning match 1–0 to ISL side FC Goa.

Joseph also appeared in the 2021–22 Calcutta Premier Division league, in which Mohammedan reached to the final, defeating United SC 1–0 through his solitary goal. On 18 November, Mohammedan clinched their 12th Calcutta Football League title after forty long years, defeating Railway FC 1–0, in which he scored the winner.

He began the 2021–22 I-League season on high and scored two braces against Aizawl and Sreenidi Deccan in their 2–0 and 3–1 win. He scored 15 goals in the season and emerged as top scorer, as his team finished runners-up after a 2–1 defeat to champion Gokulam Kerala in the final game at the Salt Lake Stadium on 14 May. He also appeared in the 2022 edition of Durand Cup, helping his team to reach semi-finals.

International career 

Marcus made his national team debut on 23 March 2013 against Belize where he came in as a substitute for Kenwyne Jones. The match drew 0–0.

Marcus scored his maiden international goal on 19 March 2016 against Grenada, which they drew 2–2. On 10 November 2019, during a friendly against Anguilla, Marcus scored 5 goals in the match which they won on a big margin of 15–0.

Career statistics

Club

International goals 
Scores and results list Trinidad and Tobago's goal tally first.

Honours
Gokulam Kerala
Durand Cup: 2019
Mohammedan Sporting
CFL Premier Division A: 2021, 2022
Durand Cup runner-up: 2021
I-League runner-up: 2021–22

Individual
Durand Cup Golden Boot: 2019, and 2021
Durand Cup Golden Ball: 2019
I-League Golden Boot: 2021–22 (15 goals)
I-League Hero of the Season: 2021–22

References

External links 
 
 
 
 
 TT Pro League profile

1991 births
Living people
Trinidad and Tobago footballers
Trinidad and Tobago international footballers
Point Fortin Civic F.C. players
Association football forwards
I-League players
Gokulam Kerala FC players
Trinidad and Tobago expatriate footballers
Trinidad and Tobago expatriate sportspeople in India
Expatriate footballers in India
Trinidad and Tobago youth international footballers
Trinidad and Tobago under-20 international footballers
2021 CONCACAF Gold Cup players
Mohammedan SC (Kolkata) players
Calcutta Football League players